South Carolina Gamecocks football under Steve Spurrier covers the history of the South Carolina Gamecocks football program under Steve Spurrier from 2005 to 2015.

Overview

Former Washington Redskins head coach Steve Spurrier, who achieved fame after a very successful stint as head coach at his alma mater Florida, was hired in 2005 to replace the retiring Lou Holtz.

2005 season

Spurrier led the Gamecocks to a 7–5 record and Independence Bowl appearance in his first season. As a result, Spurrier was named the 2005 SEC Coach of the Year.

2006 season

The 2006 season saw continued success under Spurrier, as the Gamecocks posted an 8–5 record and a victory over Houston in the Liberty Bowl.

2007 season

In 2007, the Gamecocks started the season 6–1, but would lose all of their next five games. The team was bowl eligible at 6–6 but was not selected for a bowl game.

2008–2009 seasons

South Carolina posted consecutive 7–6 records in 2008 and 2009, returning to postseason play with appearances in the Outback Bowl and PapaJohns.com Bowl.

2010 season

In 2010, Spurrier scored another first with the first SEC Eastern Division Championship in school history. On November 13, 2010, the Gamecocks defeated Florida 36–14 to clinch the division. Prior to this contest, USC had an all-time record of 0–12 at The Swamp. Freshman RB Marcus Lattimore rushed for 212 yards and 3 touchdowns in the game. Spurrier got his first win in Gainesville as a Gamecock, received a "Gatorade Bath" from his players, and became the first coach to win the SEC East with two different teams. Earlier in the season, the Gamecocks posted the program's first win over a No. 1 team in program history, with a 35–21 victory over top-ranked, defending national champion Alabama.

2011 season

In 2011, Spurrier led USC to its most successful season in program history. The Gamecocks posted an 11–2 overall record, went 6–2 in SEC play, and defeated No. 20 Nebraska in the Capital One Bowl to earn Final Top 10 rankings in the AP and Coaches' Polls (No. 9 and No. 8, respectively). Along the way, USC defeated Georgia, Tennessee, Florida, and Clemson in the same season for the first time in program history.

The University of South Carolina was investigated in 2011–12 by the NCAA after it came to light that student-athletes (including some football players) had received an estimated $59,000 in impermissible benefits, mainly the result of discounted living expenses at a local hotel. The school imposed its own punishment, paying $18,500 in fines and cutting three football scholarships in each of the 2013 and 2014 seasons. The school also reduced its official visits for the 2012–13 year, from 56 to 30. The NCAA ruled this self-imposed punishment as adequate, stating that "the violations were limited in scope" and "there was no unethical conduct in this case", and went on to praise the school's handling of the affair, with the chairman of the NCAA infractions committee stating, "This has been one of the best cases I have seen from a process standpoint. . . . In this case, it was obvious to the committee that the university wanted to get to the truth." The commissioner went on to state that USC "wanted to ask all the hard questions of all the right people and, in some cases, they even went beyond what the NCAA staff was doing."

2012 season

In 2012 Steve Spurrier, once again, led his South Carolina football team to double-digit wins during the course of the regular season campaign. The 2012 regular season culminated with the annual season-ending game against arch-rival Clemson at Clemson's Memorial Stadium. Spurrier and his Gamecocks emerged with a fourth consecutive victory over the Tigers – a victory marked by Spurrier winning his 65th game at Carolina and, in doing so, becoming the winningest coach in Gamecock football history surpassing Rex Enright's 64-win total. Spurrier led the Gamecocks to a thrilling 33–28 victory in the Outback Bowl against the winningest program in college football, Michigan. The victory elevated the Gamecocks to an 11–2 record for the second consecutive season. Additionally, by finishing 8th in the Associated Press poll and 7th in the Coaches poll, South Carolina finished in Top 10 of both polls for the second consecutive year.

2013 season

In 2013, Spurrier and the Gamecocks finished with another extremely successful 11–2 season. The season started off with a convincing 27–10 win over North Carolina, although they fell to Georgia for the first time in four years, 41–30. Carolina went on a four-game winning streak before falling to Tennessee in Knoxville after starting quarterback Connor Shaw left the game with a knee injury. In the following game against division-leading #5 Missouri, Shaw was sidelined due to injury, and backup Dylan Thompson got the start. After a weak performance from the Gamecocks in the first three quarters, Shaw was put in the game in the fourth quarter with South Carolina down 0–17. Shaw went on to lead a historic comeback in which the Gamecocks beat Missouri in double overtime, 27–24. That game was the first of a six-game winning streak in which Spurrier and Carolina won the rest of their games, posting another 11–2 season. In the highest-ranked meeting of rivals, the #9 Gamecocks defeated #4 Clemson for the fifth year in a row, a school record, by a score of 31–17. Spurrier led the Gamecocks to a 34–22 victory over the #19 Wisconsin in the 2014 Capital One Bowl. South Carolina finished with the highest ranking in school history in the AP poll, ranked at #4 in the country.

2014 season

South Carolina opened the 2014 season at home against Texas A&M, and the Aggies' 52–28 upset over the #9 Gamecocks snapped college football's longest active home winning streak. Carolina earned a measure of redemption two weeks later, knocking off the #6 Georgia Bulldogs at home. Two weeks later, the 13th-ranked Gamecocks would again suffer a home upset, falling to Missouri, 21–20. This loss dropped USC out of the top 25 for the first time since the 2010 season. The Gamecocks closed out the regular season with their first loss in six years to their in-state rival, #21 Clemson, 35–17. Spurrier and his team finished the 2014 campaign with the program's fourth-straight bowl win, a victory over the Miami Hurricanes in the 2014 Independence Bowl and a 7–6 overall record.

2015 season

On October 12, 2015, after a 2–4 start to the season, Spurrier announced to his team that he would be resigning, effective immediately. Offensive line coach/co-offensive coordinator Shawn Elliott was named the team's interim head coach. Elliott led the Gamecocks to victory the following week against Vanderbilt but lost the final five games of the season; including a 23–22 loss to FCS opponent The Citadel, their first since 1990, and ended the season with a 3–9 overall record. Many of South Carolina's most successful seasons came during the Steve Spurrier era, including a SEC East Division championship in 2010 and three consecutive eleven win seasons (2011–13). Spurrier also boasted a 6–4 record against the school's in-state rival, Clemson, including five consecutive wins during the 2009–2013 seasons.

Head coaching record

Notes

References

South Carolina Gamecocks football
South Carolina Gamecocks football seasons
History of college football by team